Mud Island is a small peninsula located in Memphis, Tennessee.  It is bordered by the Mississippi River to the west and the Wolf River and Harbor Town to the east. Mud Island River Park is located within the Memphis city limits, 1.2 miles from the coast of downtown. Mud Island includes a museum, restaurants, an amphitheater, and a residential area.  It is accessible by the Memphis Suspension Railway (a monorail), by foot (via a footbridge located on top of the monorail), kayak, paddle board, or automobile. Activities on Mud Island include concerts/performances, kayaking, paddle boarding, and biking. The park is currently controlled by the Riverfront Development Corporation. Admission to the park is free.

Parts of Mud Island

Mud Island River Park
Mud Island River Park, opened in 1982, is located on the south end of the peninsula. Mud Island River Park includes bike trails, paddleboats, and kayaks, as well as a hydraulic scale model of the lower Mississippi River from Cairo, Illinois to New Orleans.

The hydraulic scale model of the Mississippi River on Mud Island is referred to as the Riverwalk. The replica is carved out of cement to provide a scale model of the Mississippi River. The model is 2,000 feet long and includes plaques with details about the river’s history throughout.

Mississippi River Museum

The Mississippi River Museum is located on Mud Island. It includes 18 galleries and exhibits. It presents the history of the lower Mississippi River Valley over the span of the last 10,000 years. The museum also displays over 5,000 artifacts.

Mud Island Amphitheater
The Mud Island Amphitheater is a concrete outdoor amphitheater that seats up to 5,000 people. The structure has been used for concerts and shows since it was built in 1982.

Harbor Town 
The northern portion of Mud Island ("Harbor Town") includes mansions, single-family homes, and apartment complexes. The total population of Harbor Town is 14,648. Harbor Town offers various trails and ponds, as well as a shopping district and a private school. Harbor town also offers a dog park that allows for dogs to be let off the leash.

Activities

Recreation 
Kayaks and paddle boards are available to rent on Mud Island at Fourth Cup coffee kiosk in the River Garden. They are available every day of the week from 9 a.m. to 5 p.m.There is also a portion of the Wolf River Greenway on Mud Island that provides a trail for walking, running, or biking.

Performances 
Mud Island Amphitheater has been used to host concerts and shows since it was built in 1982 but has gone unused since 2018. The city of Memphis is putting $4 million towards renovations on the amphitheater so it can be used as a concert venue again. 

A few artists that have performed there are Bob Dylan, Journey, Eric Clapton, and Peter Frampton.

Restaurants 
The River Inn of Harbor Town also offers three different restaurants including Paulette’s Restaurant, Tug’s Casual Grill, and Terrace at the River Inn. Café Eclectic also has one location in Harbor Town.

The main grocery store on Mud Island, located in Harbor Town, is Cordelia's Market.

History
Mud Island had been formed by a buildup of silt, gravel, and sand by 1899. It was originally referred to as City Island until the 1950s. Mud Island became the location of the Memphis Downtown Airport in 1959 and was used primarily by wealthy businessmen to access Downtown Memphis. In 1960, the Wolf River Levee was used to divert the flow of the Wolf River. The airport was shut down in 1970 due to the construction of the Interstate 40 bridge. In 1976, the architect responsible for the Memphis International Airport and Memphis College of Art came up with a project to turn 50 acres of property owned by the city into a destination designed to attract locals and tourists alike. The proposed name for the park was Volunteer Park, but it was later named Mud Island Park when it was opened on July 4, 1982.

Governance 
The park has been run by several different groups including the Park Commission, The Parks Division, Sidney Shlenkner, and the RDC (Riverfront Development Corporation). The RDC is being in charge of running the park since 2000.

Notable events 

 On October 1, 2020 a break-in at the Mississippi River Museum was reported to police. Over $50,000 worth of historical artifacts were stolen shortly after the museum shut down due to the COVID-19 pandemic. The burglar(s) have yet to be found as of February 2021.
 On Sunday, January 23, 2021 human bones were found scattered in an area of tall grass near the large Memphis sign, located on the southern end of the peninsula, by a landscaping crew. The remains were found in an area that tends to be covered with water at different points in the year, and the police stated the remains may have washed up from the Mississippi River, but it is still unknown at this point. The police have yet to release any further information on the case as of February 21, 2021.

See also
 The Firm (1993 film)—Mud Island is the setting for the climactic chase
 List of contemporary amphitheatres
 List of museums in Tennessee

References

External links

 Official Site
http://www.harbortownmemphis.com

Landforms of Shelby County, Tennessee
Maritime museums in Tennessee
Museums in Memphis, Tennessee
Neighborhoods in Memphis, Tennessee
Parks in Tennessee
Peninsulas of Tennessee
River islands of Tennessee
Tourist attractions in Memphis, Tennessee